The regeneration of the lens of the eye has been studied, mostly in amphibians and rabbits, from the 18th century.  In the 21st century, an experimental medical trial has been performed in humans as this is a promising technique for treating cataracts, especially in children.

History
In 1781, Charles Bonnet found that a salamander had regenerated an eye one year after most of it, including the lens, had been removed.  Vincenzo Colucci made a histological study of the phenomenon in newts, publishing his finding that it regenerated from the iris in 1891.  Gustav Wolff then published several papers on the topic, starting in 1895, and this form of regeneration is now called Wolffian regeneration. The priority issue between Colucci and Wolff is examined in more detail by Holland (2021).

Regeneration of the lens in rabbits was first studied by French surgeons Cocteau and Leroy-D'Étiolle, starting in 1824.  The crystallin contents of the lens capsule were removed but this was found to regenerate within a month.  The rabbit is suitable for development of surgical techniques on the eye because it is easy to handle and its eye is comparatively large.  Research in rabbits showed that their lens would start to regenerate within two weeks after a capsulotomy – a surgical technique in which the crystalline lens material is removed but the surrounding capsule which contained it is left mostly intact.  The new lens was similar in structure to the structure but its shape might be irregular.  Filling the capsule during regeneration seemed to encourage development of a more normal shape.  The technique was also found to work in primates and so has been studied as a possible technique for treating cataracts in humans.  Other animals in which lens regeneration has been observed include cats, chickens, dogs, fish, mice, rats and Xenopus frogs.

Experimental trials
A lens regeneration technique was trialled in a collaboration between Sun Yat-sen University and University of California, San Diego which was published in 2016. The capsule of the lens was pierced with a smaller cut than in conventional cataract surgery – just 1–1.5 mm – and drained of its contents clouding the vision causing cataracts.  The capsule was otherwise left intact as this is lined with lens epithelial stem cells, which then reproduced to regenerate the lens. The technique was performed successfully in experiments in rabbits and macaques, and subsequently in a trial of twelve children under two years in China who had been born with cataracts. Working lenses regenerated within six to eight months.

The children treated with the experimental technique experienced fewer complications than twenty-five children treated by conventional surgery. Children are the most promising subjects because their stem cells are more vigorous than in adults.  Also, conventional treatment of childhood cataracts using an artificial lens can cause complications in children because they are still growing. The technique has yet to be tried with older patients with age-related cataracts, but is expected to be less successful. Adult cataracts are more difficult to remove and adult lens stem cells regenerate more slowly.

In vitro techniques
Another regenerative technique is to grow eye tissues, such as the lens, outside the body and then to implant it.  This has been tried in a collaboration between Osaka University and Cardiff University.

Mechanisms
The regeneration of the lens has been studied in several vertebrate species, especially the newt, which is able to repeatedly regenerate a perfect lens.  One study found that the lens of a newt that had been extracted and regenerated 18 times was indistinguishable from the lens of a control newt in terms of appearance and gene expression.  In such cases, the lens has been found to regenerate completely from epithelial cells in the cornea or iris.  The signalling mechanisms which control this process include fibroblast growth factor, hedgehog, retinoic acid, transforming growth factor beta and wnt.  The Haotian, Hong, Jie, Shan trial conducted experiments on mice, rabbits and cultured human cells and reported that the proteins produced by the PAX6 and BMI1 genes were essential for regeneration of existing lens epithelial cells (LECs) lining the lens capsule.

References

Further reading

Disorders of lens
Stem cells
Regenerative biomedicine